The Lauteraar Rothörner are a multi-summited mountain of the Bernese Alps, overlooking the Unteraar Glacier in the canton of Bern. They lie one kilometre south-east of the Hugihorn, on the range separating the Strahlegg Glacier from the Lauteraar Glacier, both tributaries of the Unteraar Glacier.

References

External links
 Lauteraar Rothörner on Hikr

Bernese Alps
Mountains of the Alps
Alpine three-thousanders
Mountains of Switzerland
Mountains of the canton of Bern